The Way They Live is a late 19th-century painting by American artist Thomas Anshutz. Done in oil on canvas, the painting is in the collection of the Metropolitan Museum of Art.

References 

1879 paintings

Paintings in the collection of the Metropolitan Museum of Art
Black people in art